Japan 1996 Live is the eleventh full-length album by German electronic music outfit Cluster.  It was the second of three live albums released by Cluster.

Japan 1996 Live was recorded at On Air West in Tokyo and also in Osaka, Japan in June, 1996. It was Cluster's first release for the Japanese Captain Trip label, which has subsequently released a number of Cluster and Kluster reissues.  The album was co-produced by noted keyboardist and ambient music composer Tim Story.

Track listing
From Osaka "Muse Hall"/"On Air West" (Tokyo) – 25:21
From Osaka "Muse Hall" – 6:26
From Osaka "Club Quattro" – 4:14
From Osaka "Muse Hall" – 35:13

Personnel
Hans-Joachim Roedelius – synthesizer [Ensoniqe Ts10], piano [Yamaha], wind chimes, tape, effects
Dieter Moebius – synthesizer [Korg Prophecy, Proteus Sfx], tape, effects
Felix Jay – producer
Tim Story – producer

References 
 Curry, Russ A Curious History of Cluster.  Retrieved August 18, 2007.
 Discogs .  Retrieved August 19, 2007.

Cluster (band) albums
1997 live albums